MonoUML is a CASE tool based on the Mono framework. Designed for allowing Unix/Linux developers to design computer systems faster using a friendly GUI application. Not only a diagramming tool but rather a complete CASE tool based on the OMG standards and fully compatible with proprietary tools. MonoUML supports reverse engineering of executables (.exe) or .NET assemblies.

See also
List of UML tools

References

External links
MonoUML website
MonoUML old documentation
MonoUML on Novell (Also where source downloads are available from)

UML tools